Beloved Darling (German: Geliebter Schatz) is a 1943 German comedy film directed by Paul Martin and starring Johannes Riemann, Dorit Kreysler and Sonja Ziemann.  It was shot partly at the Babelsberg Studios in Berlin. The film's sets were designed by the art directors Franz Bi and Bruno Lutz. It is based on the play Babusch by Hungarian writer Gábor Vaszary.

Cast
 Johannes Riemann as Felix Eilers
 Dorit Kreysler as 	Eva
 Sonja Ziemann as 	Lette Eilers
 Ida Wüst as Frau Wittich
 Harald Paulsen as Herr Heoger
 Hilde Jansen as Frau Heoger
 Ernst Waldow as 	Herr Riemann
 Ursula Herking as 	Frau Reimann
 Ewald Wenck as 	Pedell Kielreiter
 Gertrud Wolle as 	Freulein Tante
 O.E. Hasse as Rechtsanwald
 Leo Slezak as Generaldirektor
Sigrid Becker as Stubenmädchen
 Leo Peukert as 	Physiklehrer
 Maria Litto as 	Eine Dame, auf der Str, angsprochen

References

Bibliography 
 Klaus, Ulrich J. Deutsche Tonfilme: Jahrgang 1942. Klaus-Archiv, 1988.
 Moeller, Felix. The Film Minister: Goebbels and the Cinema in the Third Reich. Edition Axel Menges, 2000.

External links 
 

1943 films
Films of Nazi Germany
German comedy films
1943 comedy films
1940s German-language films
Terra Film films
Films shot at Babelsberg Studios
German films based on plays
Films directed by Paul Martin
1940s German films